Jilebi  is a 2015 Indian Malayalam-language children's film directed by Arun Shekar for the producer East Coast Vijayan, starring Jayasurya, Ramya Nambeesan and Vijayaraghavan. The film released on 31 July 2015 to generally positive reviews.

Plot
Jilebi is a story about confrontation between the middle aged Sreekuttan and his city-bred nephews. Sreekuttan is a villager whose life is confined to his farm and crops. Far away in Dubai, trouble brews for him in the form of his nephew and niece. From their first meeting, it becomes evident that both Sreekuttan and the children are uncomfortable with the rustic setting. The only thing holding them down are their roots to the place. The tech-savvy kids are determined to make everyone around them miserable. Soon enough their vacation comes to a close and they leave their family home with Sreekuttan in charge to start school in Kodaikanal. The road trip to their new school leads to surprises - some sour, some sweet for both alike. A bond develops between Sreekuttan and the children. At school they meet Shilpa - the children's mother. She angrily lambasts Sreekuttan and blames his village farming attitude and lack of responsibility for being late for admissions. Sreekuttan puts Shilpa in her place for her snobbish attitude and reminds her money does not make relationships change their inherent values. Later, understanding her mistake Shilpa lets her children attend school near the family house and flies back from Dubai to Thrissur.

Cast

 Jayasurya as Sreekuttan
 Ramya Nambeesan as Shilpa
 Gourav Menon as Pachu, Shilpa's son
 Baby Sayuri as Ammu, Shilpa's daughter 
 Vijayaraghavan as Chandradas, Shilpa's father
 Shari as Shilpa's mother
 K. P. A. C. Lalitha as Sreekuttan's mother
 Dharmajan Bolgatty as Tony
 Leema Babu as Reji, Shilpa's colleague
 Minon John
 Disney James as Vijay,  Shilpa's colleague
 Tony Alex Valluvassery as Jithendra

Soundtrack
Music by Bijibal, Lyrics by East Coast Vijayan, Santhosh Varma

 "Njaanoru Malayalee" - P. Jayachandran
 "Varika Omale" - Gayathri Ashokan, Najim Arshad
 "Cycle Vannu" - chorus

References

External links
 
 

2015 films
2010s children's comedy films
Indian children's comedy films
Films shot in Dubai
Films shot in Kodaikanal
Films shot in Thrissur
2010s Malayalam-language films